Cheilymenia stercorea is a species of apothecial fungus belonging to the family Pyronemataceae.

This is a common appearing throughout the year as orange-red discs up to 3 mm in diameter, clustered on dung, usually from cows. The spores are elliptical and measure 14–18 by 8–10 μm, while the asci are 175–220 by 9–12 μm. It is found in Europe and North America.

References

External links

Pyronemataceae
Fungi described in 1800
Fungi of Europe
Fungi of North America
Taxa named by Christiaan Hendrik Persoon